Solar Impulse is a Swiss long-range experimental solar-powered aircraft project, and also the name of the project's two operational aircraft. The privately financed project is led by Swiss engineer and businessman André Borschberg and Swiss psychiatrist and balloonist Bertrand Piccard, who co-piloted Breitling Orbiter 3, the first balloon to circle the world non-stop. The Solar Impulse project's goals were to make the first circumnavigation of the Earth by a piloted fixed-wing aircraft using only solar power and to bring attention to clean technologies.

The aircraft is a single-seated monoplane powered by photovoltaic cells; it is capable of taking off under its own power.  The prototype, often referred to as Solar Impulse 1, was designed to remain airborne up to 36 hours. It conducted its first test flight in December 2009. In July 2010, it flew an entire diurnal solar cycle, including nearly nine hours of night flying, in a 26-hour flight. Piccard and Borschberg completed successful solar-powered flights from Switzerland to Spain and then Morocco in 2012, and conducted a multi-stage flight across the US in 2013.

A second aircraft, completed in 2014 and named Solar Impulse 2, carries more solar cells and more powerful motors, among other improvements. On 9 March 2015, Piccard and Borschberg began to circumnavigate the globe with Solar Impulse 2, departing from Abu Dhabi in the United Arab Emirates. The aircraft was scheduled to return to Abu Dhabi in August 2015 after a multi-stage journey around the world. By June 2015, the plane had traversed Asia, and in July 2015, it completed the longest leg of its journey, from Japan to Hawaii. During that leg, the aircraft's batteries sustained thermal damage and took months to replace. A battery cooling system was installed and Solar Impulse 2 resumed the circumnavigation in April 2016, when it flew on to California. It continued across the US until it reached New York City in June 2016. Later that month, the aircraft crossed the Atlantic Ocean to the city of Seville. It stopped in Egypt before returning to Abu Dhabi on 26 July 2016, more than 16 months after it had left, completing the approximately 42,000-kilometre (26,000-mile) first circumnavigation of the Earth by a piloted fixed-wing aircraft using only solar power.

In 2019 the Solar Impulse 2 aircraft was sold to Skydweller, a Spanish-American company that is developing autonomous unmanned aerial vehicles capable of continuous flight. It plans to use the plane for research and development flights, after which the Solar Impulse 2 is planned to be on permanent display at the Swiss Museum of Transport.

Project development and funding
Bertrand Piccard initiated the Solar Impulse project in November 2003 after undertaking a feasibility study in partnership with the École Polytechnique Fédérale de Lausanne (EPFL). As a mechanical engineer, co-founder André Borschberg directed the construction of each aircraft and oversees the preparation of the flight missions. By 2009, they had assembled a multi-disciplinary team of 50 engineers and technical specialists from six countries, assisted by about 100 outside advisers and 80 technological partners.

The project is financed by a number of private companies and individuals, as well as receiving around CHF 6 million (US$6.4 million) in funding from the Swiss government. The project's private financial backers include Omega SA, Solvay, Schindler, ABB and Peter Diamandis. The EPFL, the European Space Agency and Dassault have provided technical expertise, while SunPower provided the aircraft's photovoltaic cells.

Piccard stated that the entire project from its beginnings in 2003 until mid-2015 had cost €150 million. It raised another €20 million in late 2015 to continue the round-the-world flight.

Timeline
 2002: Feasibility study at the École Polytechnique Fédérale de Lausanne
 2004–2005: Development of the concept
 2006: Simulation of long-haul flights
 2006–09: Construction of first prototype (HB-SIA; Solar Impulse 1)
 2009: First flight of Solar Impulse 1
 2009–11: Manned test flights
 2011–12: Further test flights through Europe and North Africa
 2011–13: Construction of second prototype (HB-SIB; Solar Impulse 2)
 2013: Continental flight across the US by Solar Impulse 1
 2014: First flight of Solar Impulse 2 
 2015–2016: Circumnavigation of the Earth by Solar Impulse 2, conducted in seventeen stages over 16-1/2 months

Solar Impulse 1 (HB-SIA)

The first Solar Impulse aircraft, registered as HB-SIA, was primarily designed as a demonstration aircraft. It has a non-pressurized cockpit and a single wing with a wingspan similar to that of the Airbus A340 airliner. Under the wing are four nacelles, each with a set of lithium polymer batteries, a  electric motor and one twin-bladed propeller. To keep the wing as light as possible, a customised carbon fibre honeycomb sandwich structure was used. 11,628 photovoltaic cells on the upper wing surface and the horizontal stabilizer generate electricity during the day to power the electric motors and to charge the batteries allowing flight at night, theoretically enabling the single-seat plane to stay in the air indefinitely.

The aircraft's major design constraint is the capacity of the lithium polymer batteries. In addition to the charge stored in its batteries, the aircraft uses the potential energy of height gained during the day to power its night flights.

Specifications

Operational history

Maiden flight and other early flights 

On 26 June 2009, Solar Impulse 1 was first presented to the public at the Dübendorf Air Base, Switzerland. Following taxi testing, a short-hop test flight was made on 3 December 2009, piloted by Markus Scherdel. Borschberg, co-leader of the project team, said of the flight: 

On 7 April 2010, the plane conducted an 87-minute test flight, piloted by Markus Scherdel. On 28 May 2010, the aircraft made its first flight powered entirely by solar energy, charging its batteries in flight.

First overnight flight
On 8 July 2010, Solar Impulse 1 achieved the world's first manned 26-hour solar-powered flight. The airplane was flown by Borschberg, and took off at 06:51 Central European Summer Time (UTC+2) on 7 July from Payerne Air Base, Switzerland. It returned for a landing the following morning at 09:00 local time. At the time, the flight was the longest and highest ever flown by a manned solar-powered aircraft; these records were officially recognized by the Fédération Aéronautique Internationale (FAI) in October 2010.

International and intranational flights

Belgium and France (2011)

On 13 May 2011 at 21:30 local time, the plane landed at Brussels Airport, after completing a 13-hour flight from its home base in Switzerland. The aircraft's slow cruising speed required operating at a mid-altitude, allowing much faster air traffic to be routed around it. The aircraft was piloted by Borschberg. The project's other co-founder, Piccard, said in an interview after the landing: "Our goal is to create a revolution in the minds of people...to promote solar energies – not necessarily a revolution in aviation."

A second international flight to the Paris Air Show was attempted on 12 June 2011, but the plane turned back and returned to Brussels because of adverse weather conditions. In a second attempt on 14 June, Borschberg successfully landed the aircraft at Paris' Le Bourget Airport after a 16-hour flight.

First intercontinental flight (2012)
On 5 June 2012, the Solar Impulse successfully completed its first intercontinental flight, a 19-hour trip from Madrid, Spain, to Rabat, Morocco. During the first leg of the flight from Payerne Air Base to Madrid, the aircraft broke several further records for solar flight, including the longest solar-powered flight between pre-declared waypoints and along a course.

United States (2013)

On 3 May 2013, the plane began its cross-US flight with a journey from Moffett Field in Mountain View, California, to Phoenix Goodyear Airport in Arizona. Successive legs of the flight ended at Dallas-Fort Worth airport, Lambert–St. Louis International Airport, Cincinnati Municipal Lunken Airport to change pilots and avoid strong winds, and Washington Dulles International Airport. On 6 July 2013, following a lengthy layover in Washington, Solar Impulse completed its cross-country journey, landing at New York City's JFK International Airport at 23:09 EDT. The landing occurred three hours earlier than originally intended, because a planned flyby of the Statue of Liberty was cancelled as a result of damage to the covering on the left wing.

Each flight leg took between 14 and 22 hours. The aircraft's second leg of its trip on 23 May to Dallas-Fort Worth covered  and set several new world distance records in solar aviation. Solar Impulse 1 was placed on public display at JFK after its landing. In August 2013, it was disassembled, then transported via a Cargolux B-747-400F to Dübendorf Air Base, where it was placed in storage in a hangar.

Detailed route
Source:

Aircraft on display 
In March 2015, the plane was transported by truck to Paris to be part of the permanent exhibition at Cité des Sciences et de l'Industrie.

Solar Impulse 2 (HB-SIB)

Construction history
Construction started in 2011 on the second aircraft, known as Solar Impulse 2, which carries the Swiss registration HB-SIB. Completion was initially planned for 2013, with a 25-day circumnavigation of the globe planned for 2014. A structural failure occurred on the aircraft's main spar during static tests in July 2012, leading to delays in the flight testing schedule to allow repairs. Solar Impulse 2'''s first flight took place at Payerne Air Base on 2 June 2014.

Design
It features a non-pressurized cockpit  in size and advanced avionics, including limited functionality of an autopilot that allows the pilot to sleep for up to 20 minutes at a time, enabling multi-day transcontinental and trans-oceanic flights.

Specifications

Operational historySolar Impulse 2 was first publicly displayed on 9 April 2014. Its inaugural flight took place on 2 June 2014, piloted by Markus Scherdel. The first night flight was completed on 26 October 2014, and the aircraft reached its maximum altitude during a flight on 28 October 2014.
2015–16 circumnavigation of the Earth

The repair work to the aircraft's main spar delayed Solar Impulse 2s circumnavigation of the Earth from 2012 to 2015. The aircraft was delivered to Masdar City in Abu Dhabi for the World Future Energy Summit in late January 2015, and it began the journey from Al Bateen Executive Airport on 9 March 2015. It was scheduled to return to the same location in August 2015. A mission control centre for the circumnavigation was established in Monaco, using satellite links to gather real-time flight telemetry and remain in constant contact with the aircraft and the support team.
The route followed by Solar Impulse 2 was entirely in the Northern Hemisphere. It left Abu Dhabi, then it headed east to nearby Oman and India."Solar Impulse lands in California after Pacific crossing", BBC, 24 April 2016 Twelve stops were originally planned along the route, with pilots Borschberg and Piccard alternating; at each stop, the crew awaited good weather conditions along the next leg of the route. Legs of the flight crossing the Pacific and Atlantic oceans were the longest stages of the circumnavigation, taking up to five days and nights. On multi-day flights, the pilots took 20-minute naps and used yoga or other exercises to promote blood flow and maintain alertness.

By the end of May 2015, the plane had traversed Asia. It made an unscheduled stop in Japan to await favourable weather over the Pacific, increasing the expected number of legs of the journey to 13.Randall, Tom. "This Plane Runs on Sun and Is About to Smash Some Records", Bloomberg L.P., 15 June 2015 The aircraft began the flight from Japan to Hawaii on 28 June 2015 (29 June, Japan local time). With Borschberg in the cockpit, it reached Hawaii on 3 July, setting new records for the world's longest solar-powered flight both by time (117 hours, 52 minutes) and distance (7,212 km; 4,481 mi). The flight's duration was also a record for longest solo flight, by time, for any aircraft.The Fédération Aéronautique Internationale (FAI) website states that the "Free distance along course" was 7,039.9 km. FAI Record ID #17595 , Fédération Aéronautique Internationale. Retrieved 29 July 2015 During that leg the plane's batteries were damaged by overheating because they were packed in too much insulation. New parts had to be ordered, and as it was late in the season, with days shortening in the northern hemisphere, the plane was grounded in Hawaii. The US Department of Transportation stored the aircraft in a hangar at Kalaeloa Airport on Oahu.Molko, Davis. "Solar Impulse: Plane's pilots ground record-setting attempt until 2016", CNN, 15 July 2015
New batteries were made and installed in the plane. Test flights began in February 2016 to prepare for resumption of the circumnavigation once northern hemisphere days lengthened enough to permit multi-day solar-powered flights. A favourable weather window opened in April 2016, and the plane resumed its journey,Delony, Jennifer. "Solar Impulse Live: Solar Airplane Pilot Gives Interview While Flying from Hawaii to California", RenewableEnergyWorld.com, 22 April 2016 landing at Moffett Field, in California, on 23 April. During that flight, Piccard, via a live videolink, spoke with Ban Ki-Moon and Doris Leuthard before the General Assembly of the United Nations, from the cockpit of Solar Impulse 2, commenting on that day's historic signing of the Paris Agreement and discussing how using clean technologies can create jobs and fight global warming. Additional legs of the flight were added in the US as Solar Impulse 2 flew to Phoenix, Arizona, Tulsa, Oklahoma, Dayton, Ohio, Lehigh Valley, Pennsylvania and New York City, arriving there on 11 June 2016.
Piccard piloted the aircraft across the Atlantic Ocean, arriving in Seville, Spain, on 23 June. The aircraft next stopped in Cairo, Egypt, on 13 July, and landed in Abu Dhabi on 26 July, completing the around-the-world trip in a total of 17 stages and 16-1/2 months; it was the first circumnavigation of the Earth by a piloted fixed-wing aircraft using only solar power.
Detailed routeNotes:'  — Leg 7 was planned as a 144-hour flight from Nanjing, China to Hawaii. Deteriorating weather forced a diversion to Nagoya, Japan.

Post-flight sale
In September 2019 the Solar Impulse 2 aircraft was sold to Skydweller, a Spanish-American company that is developing autonomous unmanned aerial vehicles capable of continuous flight and “carrying radar, electronic optics, telecommunications devices, telephone listening and interception systems”. As part of this sale, the Solar Impulse 2 aircraft was transferred from Switzerland to Spain though once Skydweller completes its research and development flights the Solar Impulse 2 will be transferred back to Switzerland for permanent display at the Swiss Museum of Transport.
By February 2023, Skydweller Aero had conducted its first autonomous flight and was planning to have a production aircraft operational by 2024; its goal is to operate year-round in latitudes between Miami (26°N) to Rio de Janeiro (23°S).

 Honours 
In 2016, the Swiss Post edited a special stamp to honour the achievement of Solar Impulse 2''.

See also

Notes and references

External links

Official website 
 Official YouTube channel

Aircraft manufactured in Switzerland
Solar-powered aircraft
Swiss experimental aircraft
Vehicles introduced in 2009
2009 in science
2013 in science
2013 in California
Solar power in Switzerland
Four-engined tractor aircraft
Electric aircraft
Circumnavigation